John Harold Kander (born March 18, 1927) is an American composer, known largely for his work in the musical theater. As part of the songwriting team Kander and Ebb (with lyricist Fred Ebb), Kander wrote the scores for 15 musicals, including Cabaret (1966) and Chicago (1975), both of which were later adapted into acclaimed films. He and Ebb also wrote the standard "New York, New York" (also known as "Theme from New York, New York").

Early life

John Kander, the second son of Harold and Bernice (Aaron) Kander, was born on March 18, 1927, in Kansas City, Missouri. He has stated that he grew up in a loving, middle-class Jewish family and maintained a lifelong close relationship with his older brother, Edward, who became a sales manager at a brokerage house in the city. John attributes his early interest in music (starting at age four) to the family's love of singing around the piano. His first composition was a Christmas carol, written during second-grade mathematics class; his teacher's encouragement led to the school choir singing it for a holiday assembly. He attended his first opera performances at the age of nine, when the San Carlo Opera came to Kansas City with their productions of Aida and Madama Butterfly. According to Kander, "My mother took me and we sat in the first row. There were these giants on the stage, and my feet were dangling over my seat. It was overwhelming for me, even though I could see the strings that held the beards on the Egyptian soldiers.... My interest in telling a story through music in many ways derived from early experiences like those."

Kander attended Westport High School before transferring to the Pembroke Country-Day School. During the 1940s, Kander joined the United States Merchant Marine Cadet Corps. After completing his training in California and sailing between San Francisco and Asia, Kander left the Corps on May 3, 1946. However, due to rule changes governing national service, Kander was forced to enlist in the Army Reserves in September of the same year, after having already completed one semester at the Oberlin Conservatory of Music. During the Korean War, Kander was ordered back into active duty, but he was forced to remain in New York City for six months of observation after a medical physical revealed scars on his lungs. He was officially discharged on July 3, 1957.

Kander graduated with a degree in music at Oberlin College in 1951 and went on to graduate studies at Columbia University, where he was a protégé of Douglas Moore and studied composition with Jack Beeson and Otto Luening. He earned his master's degree from Columbia University in 1953.

Career
Following his studies, Kander began conducting at summer theaters before serving as a rehearsal pianist for the musical West Side Story by Leonard Bernstein and Jerome Robbins in New York. While working, Kander met the choreographer, Jerome Robbins, who suggested that Kander compose the dance music for the show in 1959.  After that experience, he wrote dance arrangements for Irma la Douce in 1960.

Kander's first produced musical was A Family Affair in 1962, written with James and William Goldman. The same year, Kander met Fred Ebb through their mutual publisher, Tommy Volando. The first song Kander and Ebb wrote together, "My Coloring Book", was made popular by a recording from Sandy Stewart and their second song, "I Don't Care Much", was made famous by Barbra Streisand, and Kander and Ebb became a permanent team.

In 1965, Kander and Ebb wrote music for their first show on Broadway, Flora the Red Menace, produced by Hal Prince, directed by George Abbott, and with book by George Abbott and Robert Russell, in which Liza Minnelli made her Broadway debut.

Kander and Ebb have since been associated with writing material for both Liza Minnelli and Chita Rivera (including the musicals Zorba, Chicago, The Rink, and Kiss of the Spider Woman) and have produced special material for their appearances live and on television, such as Liza with a Z.

The Broadway musicals Cabaret and Chicago have been made into films. The film version of Chicago won several 2002 Academy Awards, including for best picture, film editing, costume design, art direction and sound. In his musicological and biographical study of the collaboration of Kander and Ebb, James Leve discusses the full history of Cabaret and Chicago in chapters titled "The Divinely Decadent Lives of Cabaret" and "Chicago: Broadway to Hollywood". As Leve notes, Cabaret, which is a musical adaptation of Christopher Isherwood's The Berlin Stories,  was an "ideal vehicle for Kander and Ebb's brittle and self-referential brand of musical theater."  This insight also holds true for Chicago.

Kander, along with Ebb, also wrote songs for Thornton Wilder's The Skin of Our Teeth, and it was set to premiere in London, but the rights were pulled by Wilder's nephew. He also says that Harvey Schmidt and Tom Jones, the writers of The Fantasticks, wrote a musical of Wilder's Our Town and it took them thirteen years to write, only to have the rights pulled as well by the nephew.

Kander's first musical without Ebb in many years, The Landing, with book and lyrics by Greg Pierce, premiered Off-Broadway at the Vineyard Theatre on October 23, 2013. The musical, which was a series of three "mini-musicals" was directed by Walter Bobbie and starred David Hyde Pierce and Julia Murney.  Kander's musical Kid Victory, with book and lyrics by Greg Pierce, had its world premiere February 28, 2015 at the Signature Theatre in Arlington, Virginia. Kid Victory premiered Off-Broadway at the Vineyard Theatre on February 1, 2017 in previews, and opened officially on February 22, 2017. Direction is by Liesl Tommy with choreography by Christopher Windom. The cast features Jeffry Denman and Karen Ziemba.

Kander (music) and David Thompson (lyrics) wrote the dance play The Beast in the Jungle which opened Off-Broadway at the Vineyard Theatre. The play is directed and choreographed by Susan Stroman, and features 
Tony Yazbeck and Irina Dvorovenko.  Kander collaborated with Lin-Manuel Miranda for Miranda's Hamildrop series: “Cheering for Me Now” (lyrics Miranda and music Kander) is an uplifting track about New York's ratification of the constitution.

James Leve discusses Kander's prolific career and his late musical style in the essay, "John Kander: the First Ninety-Two Years".

Personal life 
In 2010, Kander married dancer and choreographer Albert Stephenson, his partner since 1977, in Toronto. Kander's grand-nephew, Jason Kander, was formerly the Missouri Secretary of State.

Works
Lyrics by Fred Ebb unless otherwise noted

Stage musicals
A Family Affair (1962) – lyrics by William Goldman
Flora the Red Menace (1965)
Cabaret (1966)
Go Fly a Kite (1966) – music and lyrics also by Walter Marks
The Happy Time (1968)
Zorba (1968)
70, Girls, 70 (1971)
Chicago (1976)
The Act (1978)
Woman of the Year (1981)
The Rink (1984)
Diamonds (1984) – two songs: "Winter In New York" and "Diamonds Are Forever"
And The World Goes 'Round (1991)
Kiss of the Spider Woman (1992)
Steel Pier (1997)
Fosse (1999)
Over and Over (1999) – working title: The Skin Of Our Teeth
The Visit (2001)
Curtains (2006) – additional lyrics by Kander and Rupert Holmes
All About Us (2007 revision of Over and Over)
The Scottsboro Boys (2010) (Additional lyrics by Kander)
The Landing (2013) - lyrics by Greg Pierce
Kid Victory (2015) - lyrics by Greg Pierce
The Beast in the Jungle (2018)

Film and television
Kander and Ebb also contributed songs for the following movies:
Cabaret (1972) – 12 songs (mostly originally from the musical of the same name)
Funny Lady (1975) – 6 songs
Lucky Lady (1976) – 2 songs
A Matter of Time, aka Nina (1976) – 2 songs
New York, New York (1977) – 4 songs
French Postcards (1979) – 1 song
Stepping Out (1991) – 1 song ("Stepping Out")
Chicago (2002) – 15 songs (mostly originally from the musical of the same name, plus one song cut from the original show, which runs under the end credits)

Film scores
Something for Everyone (1970)
Kramer vs. Kramer (1979)
Still of the Night (1982)
Blue Skies Again (1983)
Places in the Heart (1984)
An Early Frost (TV film, NBC, 1985)
I Want to Go Home (1989)
Billy Bathgate (1991)
Breathing Lessons (TV film, CBS, 1994)
The Boys Next Door (TV film, CBS, 1996)

Television
Liza! (1970)
Ol' Blue Eyes Is Back (1973) (Frank Sinatra)
Liza with a Z (1972)
Gypsy In My Soul (1976) (Shirley MacLaine)
Baryshnikov on Broadway (1980)
Liza in London (1986)
Sam Found Out, A Triple Play (1988)
Liza Minnelli, Live From Radio City Music Hall (1992)

Awards
Tony Award, Composer and Lyricist, 1967, for Cabaret
Tony Award , Original Score, 1981, for Woman Of The Year
Tony Award , Original Score, 1993, for Kiss Of The Spider Woman
 Drama Desk Award, Outstanding Lyrics, 2010, for	The Scottsboro Boys
Laurence Olivier Award, 1998, for the London production of Chicago
Emmy Award, 1973, for Liza With A Z
Emmy Award, 1993, for Liza Minnelli Live! From Radio City Music Hall
Grammy Award, 1967, for Cabaret, Original Cast Album
Grammy Award, 1998, for Chicago, Musical Show Album

The team also received numerous nominations, which include five additional Tony Awards, two Academy Awards, and four Golden Globe Awards.

Kander, like Ebb, is also a member of the American Theater Hall of Fame, having been inducted in 1991.

In 1998, Kander and Ebb received the Kennedy Center Honors award for Lifetime Achievement.

In 2018, Kander was awarded the Stephen Sondheim award by Tony-winning Signature Theater.

In 2021, Kander was honored as a Columbia alum with the I.A.L. Diamond Award for Achievement in the Arts by The Varsity Show

References

External links

 (archive)
[ Kander biography, AllMusic]

1927 births
Living people
American musical theatre composers
Male musical theatre composers
Broadway composers and lyricists
Columbia University alumni
Grammy Award winners
American male composers
American male songwriters
Kennedy Center honorees
Oberlin College alumni
Musicians from Kansas City, Missouri
Military personnel from Missouri
United States Merchant Mariners
United States National Medal of Arts recipients
LGBT composers
LGBT Jews
LGBT people from Missouri
American gay musicians
Songwriters from Missouri
Jewish American songwriters
Jewish American composers
20th-century LGBT people
21st-century LGBT people
21st-century American Jews